During the 1998–99 season, Leeds United competed in the Premier League.

Season summary

Leeds were expected to progress once more under manager George Graham after the former Arsenal manager guided Leeds to 5th place in his first full season in charge. Graham had added to his squad, signing defender Danny Granville and Dutch striker Clyde Winjard. After just 4 games Leeds went to top of the Premier League for the first time in their history. But rumours began to spread of George Graham taking the Tottenham job after Spurs had sacked Christian Gross, the saga dragged on when finally after a UEFA cup game against Maritimo of Portugal, Graham indeed left Leeds for Tottenham. Graham's assistant David O'Leary took charge as Leeds attempted to court Leicester boss Martin O'Neil, who eventually refused. But United's performances on the pitch began improving -despite only drawing several games, many teenage players were given debuts by O'Leary and put in great performances, such as the game against Italian giants Roma in the UEFA cup (although Leeds were knocked out). Needless to say, O'Leary was appointed manager in time for the game against Derby which ended 2–2. Leeds then began winning regularly, playing impressive attacking football. They had several talented youngsters, including goal keeper Paul Robinson, defenders Ian Harte and Johnathan Woodgate, mid fielders Lee Bowyer (who was signed from Charlton 2 seasons before) and Stephen McPhail, as well as strikers Alan Smith and Harry Kewell. But David O'Leary was eager to bring in experienced players to add to this young team, and signed David Batty from Newcastle. Batty was a key player in the Leeds side that won the old Division 1 title in 1992 and a fan favourite. In the run up to Christmas, Leeds were almost in contention for a shot at the title, but suffered back to back losses against Southampton and Newcastle in the new year. This ended any league-winning hopes, and they were also knocked out of the FA cup. Despite this, Leeds ended the season in red hot form, setting a record of 7 straight wins and a 1–0 victory over Arsenal, costing the gunners the title race. Leeds finished an impressive 4th place in the league – their highest finish yet. With this achievement, and with one of the most exiting young squads in the country, the future certainly looked bright for United.

Final league table

Results summary

Results by round

Results
Leeds United's score comes first

Legend

FA Premier League

FA Cup

League Cup

UEFA Cup

First-team squad
Squad at end of season

Left club during season

Reserve squad
The following players did not appear for the first team this season.

Statistics

Appearances and goals

|-
! colspan=14 style=background:#dcdcdc; text-align:center| Goalkeepers

|-
! colspan=14 style=background:#dcdcdc; text-align:center| Defenders

|-
! colspan=14 style=background:#dcdcdc; text-align:center| Midfielders

|-
! colspan=14 style=background:#dcdcdc; text-align:center| Forwards

|-
! colspan=14 style=background:#dcdcdc; text-align:center| Players transferred out during the season

Starting 11
Considering starts in all competitions
Considering a 4–4–2 formation
 GK: #1,  Nigel Martyn, 44
 RB: #21,  Martin Hiden, 19
 CB: #25,  Jonathan Woodgate, 33
 CB: #5,  Lucas Radebe, 36
 LB: #20,  Ian Harte, 43
 RM: #11,  Lee Bowyer, 45
 CM: #12,  David Hopkin, 43
 CM: #4,  Alfie Haaland, 29
 LM: #19,  Harry Kewell, 47
 CF: #9,  Jimmy Floyd Hasselbaink, 47
 CF: #39,  Alan Smith, 17

Transfers

In

Out

Transfers in:  £7,750,000
Transfers out:  £200,000
Total spending:  £7,550,000

Loaned in
  Willem Korsten –  Vitesse Arnhem, 11 January 1999

Loaned out
  Lee Matthews –  Notts County, 24 September 1998
  Mark Jackson –  Huddersfield Town, 29 October 1998
  Lee Sharpe –  Sampdoria, 1 November 1998
  Andy Wright –  Reading, 8 December 1998
  Derek Lilley –  Hearts, 30 December 1998
  Paul Shepherd –  Tranmere Rovers, 23 February 1999
  Alan Maybury –  Reading, 25 March 1999
  Derek Lilley –  Bury, 25 March 1999

Notes

References

Leeds United F.C. seasons
Leeds United
Foot